Enestebol, also known as 4-hydroxy-17α-methyl-δ1-testosterone, as well as 4,17β-dihydroxy-17α-methylandrosta-1,4-dien-3-one, is a synthetic and orally active anabolic–androgenic steroid (AAS) and a 17α-alkylated derivative of testosterone which was never marketed. It is closely related to oxymesterone (4-hydroxy-17α-methyltestosterone), as well as to chlorodehydromethyltestosterone (4-chloro-17α-methyl-δ1-testosterone), methylclostebol (4-chloro-17α-methyltestosterone), and metandienone (17α-methyl-δ1-testosterone).

References

Androgens and anabolic steroids
Androstanes
Enols
Enones
Hepatotoxins